Marie Pauline Cécile Carnot née Dupont-White (20 July 1841 – 30 September 1898) was the wife of Marie François Sadi Carnot, the President of France from 1887 until his assassination in 1894.

Life and work 
Known as Cécile, she was born in the sixth arrondissement of Paris, the daughter of Charles Brook Dupont-White and Cécile Olympe Corbie. Her father was an economist. Cécile married Marie François Sadi Carnot in 1863.

Sadi and Cécile Carnot had four children together: Claire (who would marry Paul Cunisset ), Sadi, Ernest and François. The couple is particularly united and no extra-marital relationship is attributed to them. Cécile Carnot often advises her husband in politics.

As the wife of the president, Cécile Carnot devoted a lot of her time to representation in public and entertaining at the Presidential Palace. She hosted three balls annually and arranged garden parties at which she introduced tennis. She regarded representation as an important part of the political career for her spouse. In 1889 she introduced the annual Christmas dinner for poor children, and it became a tradition and has been held ever since.

She played a political role when she negotiated with Georges Ernest Boulanger, preventing a coup. After her husband's assassination, she lived in seclusion. She had four children, a daughter Claire and three sons, Sadi, Ernest, and François. 

She died of heart disease at the Château de Presles de Cerny, on 30 September 1898, at the age of 57, four years after her husband. Unable to join him in the Pantheon, she is buried in the cemetery of Passy.

Honors 
 Poet George Williamson wrote a poem, "To Mme Sadi Carnot, On the Death of her Husband, Late President of France" (1894). 
 A variety of rose was named in her memory.

References 

1841 births
1898 deaths
Spouses of French presidents